John C. Becket (May 14, 1810 -  September 5, 1879) was a Scottish born printer who practiced his craft in Montreal after 1832.

Becket, who was born in Kilwinning, Scotland,  immigrated to New York in 1731 and moved to Canada after a few months. He and four contemporary printers were described as "ancestors of the profession" in Montreal

External links 
 Biography at the Dictionary of Canadian Biography Online

References 

1810 births
1879 deaths
Canadian printers